Amjad Mehmood Chaudhry is a Pakistani politician who had been a member of the Provincial Assembly of the Punjab from August 2018 till January 2023

Early life and education
He was born on 7 April 1960 in Rawalpindi, Pakistan.

He has received Middle-level education.

Political career

He was elected to the Provincial Assembly of the Punjab as a candidate of Pakistan Tehreek-e-Insaf from Constituency PP-13 (Rawalpindi-VIII) in 2018 Pakistani general election.

References

Living people
Punjab MPAs 2018–2023
Pakistan Tehreek-e-Insaf MPAs (Punjab)
1960 births